Parantica aspasia, the yellow glassy tiger, is a butterfly found in Asia that belongs to the crows and tigers, that is, the danaid group of the brush-footed butterflies family.

Subspecies
Subspecies include: 
P arantica aspasia annetta (Swinhoe, 1915)
P arantica aspasia aspasia Morishita, 1970
Parantica aspasia caulonia Fruhstorfer, 1911
Parantica aspasia cerilla (Fruhstorfer, 1911)
Parantica aspasia chrysea Doherty, 1891
Parantica aspasia flymbra Fruhstorfer, 1910
Parantica aspasia kheili Staudinger, 1885
Parantica aspasia philomela Zinken-Sommer, 1831
Parantica cleona rita Fruhstorfer, 1905
Parantica aspasia shelfordi Fruhstorfer, 1905
Parantica aspasia thargalia Fruhstorfer, 1910
Parantica aspasia viridana Corbet, 1942

Distribution and habitat
This species is present in Myanmar, Thailand, Vietnam, Langkawi, W. Malaysia, Singapore, Borneo, Java, Bali, Philippines.  In Singapore is probably extinct.  These butterflies mainly inhabit forested areas.

Description

These butterflies have bluish grey wings, with a bright yellow and rather large basal patch and black markings.

Biology
Adults can be found all year around, with a peak in September-October and in December.  The females lay a single whitish spindle-shaped egg. The caterpillar hatch after about four days. They mainly feed on Gymnema species, Raphistemma species, and Vincetoxicum (syn. Tylophora) species (Asclepiadaceae). 

After about 14 days and five instars the caterpillars pupate, anchoring themselves to  the stem or leaves the host plant. The pupa is light green with black dots. After about eight days the adult butterflies emerge.

See also
 List of butterflies of India (Danainae)

Bibliography
Butler, A.G.,1866 : A Monograph of the diurnal Lepidoptera belonging to the genus Danais, being a revision of the Insects of that Genus,  with Descriptions of new species in the National Collection.- Proc. zool. Soc. Lond. 1866
Fabricius, J.C.,1787 : Mantissa Insectorum sistens eorum species nuper detectas adiectis characteribus genericis, differentiis specificis, emendationibus, observationibus. Copenhagen, Christ. Gottl. Proft.
Fruhstorfer, H.,1905 : Neue Rhopaloceren aus dem Indo-Australischen Gebiet. Ent. Zeit.

References

 

Parantica
Butterflies of Asia
Butterflies of Indochina
Butterflies described in 1787
Articles containing video clips